Enterocloster aldensis, formerly Clostridium aldenense, is a bacterium in the genus Enterocloster. The type species was isolated from clinical infections in California in the United States along E. citroniae and placed in the genus Clostridium. Together with other gram-negative species, it was moved to the new genus Enterocloster in 2020.

The name pertains to R. M. Alden Research Laboratory and its first patron, Rose M. Alden Goldstein.

References

 

Lachnospiraceae
Bacteria described in 2007